Schrankia altivolans is a species of moth of the  family Erebidae. It occurs in epigean habitats on Kauai, Oahu, Molokai, Lanai, Maui and Hawaii. It also occasionally occurs in caves on at least Maui and Hawaii.

The length of the forewings is 6–10 mm. Adults and larvae are active throughout the year.

The larvae feed on tree roots, probably of many tree species. Larvae occasionally are attracted to rotting mushroom baits used to collect native Drosophila species.

External links
Evolution of cave living in Hawaiian Schrankia (Lepidoptera: Noctuidae) with description of a remarkable new cave species

Hypenodinae
Endemic moths of Hawaii